Isabelle Morneau (born April 18, 1976 in Greenfield Park, Quebec) is Canadian retired soccer player who played for the Canada women's national soccer team. She was selected as a member of the Canadian Soccer Hall of Fame in 2014.

Morneau has been a member of Team Canada since 1995 and has played for her country in over 75 international matches which includes three Women's World Cups. A gritty and hardworking player who has overcome many injuries throughout her entire career, Morneau is one of the veterans on the team and brings tremendous experience and know-how.

Away from international soccer, Morneau played NCAA soccer at the University of Nebraska (1996–1999) and is one of the most decorated players to have graduated from the program.  She was an All-American, All-Conference, All-Academic player who led Nebraska to its best NCAA Tournament finish during her senior year.  She graduated from Nebraska with a degree in Psychology carrying a 3.6 GPA and received a scholarship from the Big 12 Conference for post-graduate studies.

Morneau has played professionally for the Ottawa Fury Women  (2003), Montreal Xtreme (2004), and currently plays for the Laval Comètes (2006–2007) of the W-League.

Now Morneau currently resides in Longueuil, Quebec and she works as a physiotherapist.

References

External links
 / Canada Soccer Hall of Fame

1976 births
Living people
Canada Soccer Hall of Fame inductees
Canadian women's soccer players
Canada women's international soccer players
1995 FIFA Women's World Cup players
1999 FIFA Women's World Cup players
2003 FIFA Women's World Cup players
Women's association football defenders
Nebraska Cornhuskers women's soccer players
Sportspeople from Longueuil
Soccer people from Quebec
Ottawa Fury (women) players
USL W-League (1995–2015) players
Laval Comets players